Signý Hermannsdóttir (born 16 January 1979) is an Icelandic former basketball player. She was named the Icelandic Women's Basketball Player of the Year in 2003 and was a six-time selection to the Úrvalsdeild kvenna Domestic All-First Team. She won the Icelandic championship in 2010 with KR.

Career
After graduating from Cameron University, Signý joined Spanish club Isla de Tenerife in 2003. She left the club in February 2004 due to unpaid salary and signed with ÍS.

In 2006, Signý helped ÍS advance to the Icelandic Basketball Cup finals, where she scored 23 points and grabbed 20 rebounds in the Cup clinching game. In 2009 she became the Úrvalsdeild kvenna all-time leader in rebounds and blocked shots. She was named the Úrvalsdeild kvenna Domestic Player of the Year that same year after averaging 19.1 points, 14.2 rebounds, 5.7 blocks and 3.8 assists per game for Valur.

In 2010, Signý led KR to the national championship and was again named the Domestic Player of the Year after averaging 12.8 points, 10.6 rebounds and 5.4 blocks per game.

After retiring in 2013, Signý served as an assistant coach to Skallagrímur during the 2015-2016 season. She headed the team for one game, a victory over KR, when head coach Manuel A. Rodríguez served a one-game suspension.

Cameron statistics

Source

Icelandic national team

Signý played 61 games for the Icelandic national basketball team between 1999 and 2009, starting 56 of them.

Awards, titles and accomplishments

Individual awards
Icelandic Women's Basketball Player of the Year: 2003
Úrvalsdeild Domestic All-First Team (6): 1999, 2005, 2006, 2008, 2009, 2010

Titles
Icelandic champion: 2010
Icelandic Basketball Cup: 2006
Icelandic Supercup (3): 1998, 2009, 2010
Icelandic Company Cup: 2009

Accomplishments
Úrvalsdeild all-time career rebounding leader
Úrvalsdeild all-time career blocks leader
Úrvalsdeild rebounding leader (3): 1998, 1999, 2005
Úrvalsdeild blocks leader (6): 1996, 1998, 2005, 2008, 2009, 2010
Icelandic All-Star game: 2005, 2006, 2008, 2010, 2011

References

External links
Profile at kki.is
Profile at Spanish Basketball Federation

1979 births
Living people
Cameron Aggies women's basketball players
Centers (basketball)
Signy Hermannsdottir
Signy Hermannsdottir
Signy Hermannsdottir
Signy Hermannsdottir
Signy Hermannsdottir
Signy Hermannsdottir
Signy Hermannsdottir
Signy Hermannsdottir
Signy Hermannsdottir